Amman Center for Human Rights Studies (ACHRS) is an independent, regional, scientific, advocacy center for studies, research and training on issues of human rights and democracy in the Middle East.

References

External links
 Official website

Human rights organisations based in Jordan
1999 establishments in Jordan
Organizations established in 1999